Shurer is a surname. Notable people with the surname include:

Osnat Shurer (born 1970/71), Israeli animation producer
Ronald J. Shurer (1978–2020), United States Army sergeant; recipient of the Congressional Medal of Honor

See also
Shure (surname)